Eric Martin (Born 4 February 1907) was an English cricketer. He was a right-handed batsman and a right-arm medium-pace bowler who played first-class cricket in 1928. He was born in Rock Ferry.

Martin made two first-class appearances for Essex during July 1928, the first of which saw him take the wicket of two-time Test cricketer Charlie Hallows — and the second, that of Percy Holmes. Martin made only small contributions with the bat, however, and was dropped from the team after his second game.

External links
Eric Martin at Cricket Archive 

1907 births
1978 deaths
English cricketers
Essex cricketers